Live @ the D.C. Star (also titled as Live PA #12: Live @ the D.C. Star) is a live album released on June 15, 2010 by the Washington, D.C.-based go-go band Rare Essence. The album was recorded live on April 17, 2010 at the D.C. Star, a music venue located in Northeast, Washington, D.C.

Track listing

"Intro" – 0:29
"Looks Like She Want It" – 2:38
"Do It Like This (Fire, Fire)" – 10:37
"R.E.F." – 3:17
"Where They At" – 4:36
"You Not Ready" – 6:32
"Hit It from the Back" – 7:38
"Clap if it's Good" – 8:39
"Don't Say No" – 10:29
"All Da Time" – 3:24
"Down for My Niggas" – 5:50
"Loveable" – 6:14
"What It Do?" – 4:04

References

External links
Live @ the D.C. Star at Discogs

2010 live albums
Rare Essence albums